This is a list of the seasons played by Paradou AC from 1994 when the club first entered a league competition to the most recent seasons. The club's achievements in all major national and international competitions as well as the top scorers are listed. Top scorers in bold were also top scorers of Ligue 1. The list is separated into three parts, coinciding with the three major episodes of Algerian football:

History

Seasons

Key 

Key to league record:
P = Played
W = Games won
D = Games drawn
L = Games lost
GF = Goals for
GA = Goals against
Pts = Points
Pos = Final position

Key to divisions:
1 = Ligue 1
2 = Ligue 2
3 = DNA
4 = Inter-Régions Division
5 = Régionale II

Key to rounds:
DNE = Did not enter
Grp = Group stage
R1 = First Round
R2 = Second Round
R32 = Round of 32

R16 = Round of 16
QF = Quarter-finals
SF = Semi-finals
RU = Runners-up
W = Winners

Division shown in bold to indicate a change in division.
Top scorers shown in bold are players who were also top scorers in their division that season.

Statistics

List of All-time appearances
This List of All-time appearances for Paradou AC contains football players who have played for Paradou AC and have managed to accrue 100 or more appearances.

Bold Still playing competitive football in Paradou AC.

1 Includes the Super Cup and League Cup.
2 Includes the Confederation Cup and Champions League.
3 Includes the UAFA Club Cup.

List of leading goalscorers

1 Includes the Super Cup and League Cup.
2 Includes the Confederation Cup and Champions League.
3 Includes the UAFA Club Cup.

List of managers
Information correct as of 24 August 2021. Only competitive matches are counted.

List of Paradou AC players hat-tricks
Position key:
GK – Goalkeeper;
DF – Defender;
MF – Midfielder;
FW – Forward;
4 – Player scored four goals;
* – The home team

Notes

References

Algerian football club seasons by club